John Blair (25 August 1898 – 1971) was a Scottish footballer who played as an outside right, mainly for Partick Thistle where he spent six seasons, making 172 appearances for the Jags in all competitions and scoring 36 goals. Blair scored the only goal of the 1921 Scottish Cup Final when Partick defeated Rangers to claim the trophy for the only time in their history.

Having gradually lost his regular place to David Ness who joined the club in 1923, two years later Blair left Thistle and made the unusual step of returning to his hometown team Saltcoats Victoria in the junior leagues, normally populated by promising teenagers (indeed Blair had also started his career at the same club), those who never reached professional status or veterans approaching retirement, rather than a player in his mid-20s with a proven reputation at a high level. His reasons for the move are not well documented, but it is known that his play was still of a high enough standard to be selected for Scotland at Junior international level on four occasions.

References

1898 births
Date of death unknown
1971 deaths
Footballers from North Ayrshire
People from Saltcoats
Scotland junior international footballers
Scottish footballers
Association football outside forwards
Scottish Junior Football Association players
Saltcoats Victoria F.C. players
Partick Thistle F.C. players
Scottish Football League players